Dance Remixes is the first remix album by Mylène Farmer, released on 23 November 1992.

Release, writing and release 
Rather than a simple compilation, the album contains two CDs in its French version, including the remixes of fifteen songs on the singer. These remixes, all made by Laurent Boutonnat and Thierry Rogen (for the latter, it was his last collaboration), have mostly been published previously as vinyl's B-sides of Mylène Farmer's singles, except "We'll Never Die" (Techno Remix) and "Libertine" (Carnal Sins Remix), made for the occasion, as the "Extended Dance Remix" of the new song "Que mon cœur lâche". This song, whose video was directed by Luc Besson, was the only single released to promote the album, and the last vinyl of the singer.

"We'll Never Die" is the only song available on this album that was never released as a single.

An international version of the album was also released. It contains only ten remixes, including the remix of "My Soul Is Slashed", the English version of "Que mon cœur lâche". Apart from the number of titles, the two covers also are distinguished by the color of the cover (black for the French version, white for the International).

The booklet's pictures, made by Marianne Rosenstiehl, show Mylène Farmer training in a gym.

There were two singles from this album: "Que mon cœur lâche", and its English-language version "My Soul Is Slashed" (only available on the European CD album).

The album peaked at #3 on the French Compilations Chart on 9 December 1992. It was re-issued in 2005 in a digipack version and was therefore charted on the Albums Charts, reaching #108 on 9 April 2005 and stayed in the top 200 for four weeks.

Track listing

French version

Disc one
 "We'll Never Die" (techno remix) – 7:30 
 "Sans contrefaçon" (boy remix) – 5:55 
 "Tristana" (club remix) – 7:10 
 "Sans logique" (illogical club remix) – 7:11 
 "Allan" (extended mix – 7:57 
 "Ainsi soit je..." (maxi remix) – 7:10 
 "Plus grandir" (mother's live remix) – 6:25 
 "À quoi je sers..." (club remix) – 7:50

Disc two
 "Que mon cœur lâche" (extended dance remix) – 8:10 
 "Pourvu qu'elles soient douces" (club remix) – 6:30 
 "Libertine" (carnal sins remix) – 7:00 
 "Je t'aime mélancolie" (extended club remix) – 7:45 
 "Regrets" (extended club remix) – 7:13 
 "Beyond My Control" (godforsaken mix – 8:03 
 "Désenchantée" (club remix) – 8:10

International version

 "My Soul Is Slashed" (the rubber mix) – 7:31 
 "Sans contrefaçon" (boy remix) – 5:55 
 "Je t'aime mélancolie" (extended club mix) – 7:45 
 "Allan" (extended mix) – 7:57 
 "Ainsi soit je..." (maxi remix) – 7:10 
 "We'll Never Die" (techno remix) – 7:30 
 "Sans logique" (illogical club remix) – 7:11 
 "Pourvu qu'elles soient douces" (club remix) – 6:30 
 "Beyond My Control" (godforsaken mix) – 8:03 
 "Désenchantée" (club remix) – 8:10

Cassette

A-side
 "We'll Never Die" (techno remix) – 7:30 
 "Sans contrefaçon" (boy remix) – 5:55 
 "Tristana" (club remix) – 7:10 
 "Sans logique" (illogical club remix) – 7:11 
 "Allan" (extended mix) – 7:57 
 "À quoi je sers..." (club remix) – 7:50

B-side
 "Que mon cœur lâche" (extended dance remix) – 8:10 
 "Pourvu qu'elles soient douces" (club remix) – 6:30 
 "Libertine" (carnal sins remix) – 7:00 
 "Je t'aime mélancolie" (extended club remix) – 7:45 
 "Beyond My Control" (godforsaken mix) – 8:03 
 "Désenchantée" (club remix) – 8:10

Versions

Personnel 
 Text: Mylène Farmer
Except: "Libertine": Laurent Boutonnat
 Music: Laurent Boutonnat
Except: "Libertine": Jean-Claude Dequéant
 Editions: Bertrand Le Page / Polygram Music
Except: "À quoi je sers...": Requiem Publishing / Bertrand Le Page; "Que mon cœur lâche", "Je t'aime mélancolie", "Regrets", "Beyond My Control", "Désenchantée": Requiem Publishing
 Record label: Polydor
 Production: Laurent Boutonnat
 Remixes produced by Laurent Boutonnat and Thierry Rogen
 Sound Engineer: Thierry Rogen (Studio Mega)
 Management: Thierry Suc
 Engraving: André Perriat (Top Master)
 Photography: Marianne Rosenstiehl (Sygma)
 Design: Com' N.B

Charts

Certifications and sales

Formats 
 Double CD
 Double 12" - Limited edition (5,000)
 CD - Germany (1)
 CD - Japan (1)
 CD - Republic of China (1)
 Cassette (2)

(1) Only 10 remixes
(2) Only 12 remixes

References 

Mylène Farmer remix albums
1992 remix albums
Polydor Records remix albums